Jach'a Pata (Aymara jach'a big, pata step,  "big step", Hispanicized spelling Jachcha Pata) is a mountain in the Cordillera Real in the Andes of Bolivia, about  high. It is situated in the La Paz Department, Larecaja Province, in the south of the Guanay Municipality. Jach'a Pata lies north-west of the mountain Janq'u K'ark'a and south of the lake Qutapata (Kkota Pata).

References 

Mountains of La Paz Department (Bolivia)